Katja Gerber (born 13 December 1975) is a German judoka.

Achievements

External links
 

1975 births
Living people
German female judoka
20th-century German women
21st-century German women